Luiz Fernando Nunes Duarte (born 4 December 1980) is a footballer who most recently played in the Portuguese Liga for Académica. He has previously played in Brazil for Juventude and in Uruguay for Peñarol.

References

1980 births
Living people
People from Santana do Livramento
Brazilian footballers
Brazilian expatriate footballers
Primeira Liga players
Esporte Clube Juventude players
Associação Académica de Coimbra – O.A.F. players
Expatriate footballers in Argentina
Expatriate footballers in Portugal
Expatriate footballers in Uruguay
Association football defenders
Sportspeople from Rio Grande do Sul